Black Rock is an album by the American blues rock guitarist Joe Bonamassa. It was recorded at Black Rock Studios in the Greek island of Santorini and it was released worldwide on March 23, 2010.

Track 8, "Night Life", features a duet between Bonamassa and his childhood hero B. B. King.

Track listing

Personnel 

 Joe Bonamassa – guitars, vocals
 Rick Melick – keyboards 
 Carmine Rojas – bass
 Bogie Bowles – drums
 Anton Fig – drums
 Thanasis Vasilopoulos – clarinet
 David Woodford – saxophone
 Manolis Karadinis – bouzouki
 Lee Thornburg – brass, brass arrangements

Guest artist:
 B.B. King – guitars, vocals

Chart performance

References 

Joe Bonamassa albums
2010 albums
Albums produced by Kevin Shirley